Émilie Georges is a French screenwriter and film producer, best known for producing the critically acclaimed film Call Me by Your Name, for which she was co-nominated for the Academy Award for Best Picture at the 90th Academy Awards. 

She is a founder of a production company Memento Films International (MFI).

Early life and education
Georges studied at Lycée Chaptal in Paris, and obtained a Master of advanced studies (DEA) in Geopolitics from University of Paris 8 Vincennes-Saint-Denis and  Maitrises in European law and International economics from University of Paris 1 Pantheon-Sorbonne.

Filmography
 2023: Drift (producer) 
 2018: Piercing (executive producer) 
 2017: Small Crimes (executive producer) 
 2017: Call Me by Your Name (producer) 
 2017: Berlin Syndrome (executive producer) 
 2015: Louder Than Bombs (executive producer) 
 2014: Still Alice (executive producer) 
 2014: Cold in July (executive producer) 
 2013: Circles (producer) 
 2013: We Are What We Are (executive producer) 
 2011: Headshot (associate producer) 
 2009: Undertow (executive producer) 
 2006: Aurore, le making-of (Video documentary short) (producer) 
 2006: Aurore (producer) 
 2006: Taxidermia (co-producer) 
 2005: Kilometre Zero (executive producer) / (producer)
Other 
 2015: The Propaganda Game (Documentary) (international sales) 
 2015: Cop Car (international distribution) 
 2015: Cop Car (thanks) 
 2013: Blue Ruin (thanks)

References

External links
 Émilie Georges at Torinofilmlab
 

Living people
Place of birth missing (living people)
Year of birth missing (living people)
French film producers
French screenwriters
Paris 8 University Vincennes-Saint-Denis alumni